Calamotropha dentatella is a moth in the family Crambidae. It was described by Shi-Mei Song and Tie-Mei Chen in 2002. It is found in Guangxi, China.

References

Crambinae
Moths described in 2002